Admiral Sir George Fowler King–Hall  (14 August 1850 – 10 September 1939) was a senior officer of the Royal Navy.

Early life
King-Hall was born on 14 August 1850 as the second surviving son of Admiral William King-Hall and Louisa Forman. His younger brother was Admiral Sir Herbert King-Hall.

Military career
He joined the Royal Navy as a cadet in 1864 and during his time as a midshipman served aboard  from 1866 to 1867.

King-Hall was promoted to commander in 1885, and was captain of the sloop  from 1877 to 1889, during which time the ship was responsible for securing the Maldives as a British protectorate, and acted against slave traders in eastern African waters.

From December 1899 until March 1900, he was in command of the battleship , on the Mediterranean station.

On 1 October 1902 he was posted to the battleship HMS Revenge, flagship of the Admiral Superintendent, Naval Reserves, where he served as assistant to the Admiral. He was the Senior Officer, Coast of Ireland Station, from 1906 to 1908.

King-Hall was later promoted to flag rank, and in 1911, was assigned as Commander in Chief of the Australia Station. During his two years in command, King-Hall helped to generate public support for the fledgling Royal Australian Navy (RAN), and to prepare the RAN for the 1913 transfer of responsibility for Australia's naval defence. King-Hall concluded his duties in Australia in October 1913, after which the office of Commander of the Australia Station was made redundant by the RAN position of Rear Admiral Commanding HM Australian Fleet. He was knighted KCB in the 1911 Coronation Honours.

Later life
King-Hall retired shortly after returning to England. He died on 13 September 1939.

He fathered two sons and two daughters. His eldest son was Stephen King-Hall, who served in the Royal Navy before becoming a politician. His daughters, Magdalen King-Hall and Lou King-Hall, were writers.

References

|-

1850 births
1939 deaths
Royal Navy admirals
People educated at Stubbington House School
Knights Commander of the Order of the Bath
Commanders of the Royal Victorian Order
People from Weymouth, Dorset
Military personnel from Dorset